Abid Khan is a British film director of Pakistani heritage. His first feature Granada Nights was released in the UK in June 2021. The Guardian felt that "in a post-Brexit world, the film and its host of international characters will certainly make the audience pine for the once robust Erasmus programme."  Rachel Brook, in One Room with a View, said: "his expat exploits make for infectious fun and the film hits its stride as he does." Franglais27 Tales called it "a charming, beautifully poetic directional debut ... that will certainly leave it's mark on audiences". Despite the COVID-19 pandemic and average reviews, it obtained a release in the UK. Khan references the work of Richard Linklater and his Before trilogy as one of the film's inspirations. Daniel Battsek (head of Film4) awarded Abid Khan's debut as Winner of Best Film at Barnes Film Festival 2020 and a "director to watch".

At sixteen, he became an usher at a small, local cinema, where he "discovered a love for cinema and visual aesthetics". This "passion" led to a BSc in multimedia at Manchester Metropolitan University in 2002, followed by an MA degree and the formation of EyeFive Ltd., a film production and digital design company.

He freelanced for fourteen years as a digital designer/art director for advertising agencies: "I storyboarded, designed, directed, edited and produced worldwide campaigns for clients such as Universal Pictures, Paramount Pictures, Sony Pictures, Time Magazine, Nike, ASOS, Cannon, Lacoste and Mercedes Benz."

He has worked in Alabama, Charleston, Berlin, NYC, London, Granada and Islamabad.  He says that: "these global experiences have given me valuable insights into other cultures and visual aesthetics which has shaped my vision and allowed me to create stories about self-discovery, rebellion, exploration and identity in a multi-cultural society."

References

Living people
Year of birth missing (living people)
British film directors
Alumni of Manchester Metropolitan University
Place of birth missing (living people)
British people of Pakistani descent